Don Short (born in 1932) is a writer, former journalist and literary agent.

Biography 
Short began his career as a junior reporter at the Staines and Egham News in 1947 before proceeding to the Richmond and Twickenham Times and Gloucestershire Echo. In 1958 he moved to Fleet Street as a general news reporter with the Daily Sketch and two years later joined the Daily Mirror where he was Chief Showbusiness correspondent. Short was given the showbusiness column after several world scoops, including the story of Elizabeth Taylor's marriage to Richard Burton, the drowning of Brian Jones of the Rolling Stones and the breakup of The Beatles. He is credited with coining the term Beatlemania.

Short has ghosted several bestselling books including those of Swedish actress Britt Ekland, Peter Sellers, Lady Norah Docker, and an authorised biography of Engelbert Humperdinck. He left the Daily Mirror in 1974.

Short established the Solo Literary Agency Ltd in 1978, which took over syndication for The Sun newspaper before moving on to the global market with stories and photos appearing in the Daily Mail, the Mail on Sunday and the Evening Standard.

In November 2015 Short appeared on ITV's 'The Nation's Favourite Beatles Number One' documentary.

In 2020, Short published his autobiography, The Beatles and Beyond.

Works 

 The Beatles and Beyond (Wymer, UK)

References 

1932 births
British newspaper journalists
Living people